My Big Brother, Boris is a children's picture book by Liz Pichon, published in 2004. It won the Nestlé Smarties Book Prize Silver Award.

References

British picture books
2004 children's books
Animal tales